Monique Marie Ryan (born 20 January 1967) is an Australian paediatric neurologist and politician. She is currently the member of parliament for the federal seat of Kooyong after defeating Josh Frydenberg at the 2022 Australian federal election.

Medical career 

Ryan graduated in medicine at the University of Melbourne in 1991. Ryan then completed her pediatric training in Sydney, Australia and a neurology residency at the Children's Hospital Boston, in Boston, Massachusetts. Ryan also completed a neurophysiology fellowship at the Lahey Clinic in Boston, Massachusetts.

Prior to becoming a Member of Parliament, Ryan was the Director of the Neurology at the Royal Children's Hospital, Melbourne. Ryan has over 150 peer-reviewed publications and has been a principal investigator on a number of clinical trials. She is joint editor of Neuromuscular Disorders of Infancy, Childhood, and Adolescence, now in its second edition.

Publications 

Ryan's publications have over 10,000 citations, and she has an H index of 50, which is a measure of the impact of her research.

Select publications include the following:

 Nemaline myopathy: a clinical study of 143 cases (2001) MM Ryan, C Schnell, CD Strickland, LK Shield, G Morgan, ST Iannaccone, et al. Annals of Neurology: Official Journal of the American Neurological. 50:3. 312–320.
 Clinical course correlates poorly with muscle pathology in nemaline myopathy (2003) MM Ryan, B Ilkovski, CD Strickland, C Schnell, D Sanoudou, C Midgett, ...  Neurology 60 (4), 665-673.
 Guillain–Barré syndrome in childhood (2005) MM Ryan. Journal of paediatrics and child health 41 (5‐6), 237-241.
 Mobile arm supports in Duchenne muscular dystrophy: a pilot study of user experience and outcomes (2021) A Cruz, L Callaway, M Randall, M Ryan. Disability and Rehabilitation: Assistive Technology 16 (8), 880–889. 
McDonald CM, Henricson EK, Abresch RT, Duong T, Joyce NC, Hu F, Clemens PR, Hoffman EP, Cnaan A, Gordish-Dressman H; CINRG Investigators. Long-term effects of glucocorticoids on function, quality of life, and survival in patients with Duchenne muscular dystrophy: a prospective cohort study. Lancet. 2017 Nov 22. pii: S0140-6736(17)32160-8.
 Finkel RS, Mercuri E, Darras BT, Connolly AM, Kuntz NL, Kirschner J, Chiriboga CA, Saito K, Servais L, Tizzano E, Topaloglu H, Tulinius M, Montes J, Glanzman AM, Bishop K, Zhong ZJ, Gheuens S, Bennett CF, Schneider E, Farwell W, De Vivo DC; ENDEAR Study Group. Nusinersen versus Sham Control in Infantile-Onset Spinal  Muscular Atrophy. N Engl J Med. 2017;377:1723–1732.

Political career
Ryan was announced as the independent candidate to run in the 2022 federal election in the seat of Kooyong. Her candidacy came about after she responded to an advertisement in The Age calling for an independent to unseat Josh Frydenberg, after he had previously received an 8% swing against him in the previous election. Ryan was one of a number of centrist "teal independents" who campaigned to unseat "moderate" Liberal Party MPs on the basis of a lack of action on climate change, amongst other policies Her campaign was backed by Voices of Kooyong and was reported to have 1500 volunteers and more than 2000 donors, as of April 2022.

Ryan won Kooyong at the 2022 election, receiving 52.9% of the two-candidate vote, subsequently defeating federal treasurer Josh Frydenberg. Ryan stated she "was still getting used" to the idea of becoming a federal member of parliament and that her result indicates "there is a momentum for change in the Australian political system". Ryan indicated her first priority would be action on climate change.

Controversies 
On 25 January 2023, Monique Ryan's chief of staff, Sally Rugg, launched a Federal Court action against Ryan in relation to a "breach of general protections under the Fair Work Act". In documents filed with the court action, an affidavit from Rugg claimed that Ryan said that she has ambitions "to be the prime minister one day" and she also claims that Ryan trivialised issues pertaining to Rugg's health when she "rolled her eyes and said ‘yeah right, stress leave’ and made air quotes with her hands" in relation to sick leave Rugg had took the preceding week. On 7 March 2023, a Federal Court judge dismissed an interlocutory application by Rugg to continue working for Ryan.

Political views
Ryan is a self-described centrist. She campaigned on a platform of action on climate change, political integrity, and gender equality.

Ryan was previously a member of the Australian Labor Party between 2007 and 2010.

Awards 
Ryan has been awarded prizes for her research in neurology, in International Congress and Societies.

 2000 – Child Neurology Society (USA)
 2022 – American Academy of Neurologists
 2006 – XIth International Congress on Neuromuscular Disorders

Personal life 
Ryan is one of seven children and was raised in the Kooyong electorate. She lives in Hawthorn with her husband Peter, two step-children and a son.

References 

Living people
1960s births
Australian neurologists
Pediatric neurologists
Independent members of the Parliament of Australia
Medical doctors from Melbourne
Members of the Australian House of Representatives
Members of the Australian House of Representatives for Kooyong
University of Melbourne alumni doctors
Women members of the Australian House of Representatives
Women neurologists
Year of birth missing (living people)
People from Hawthorn, Victoria
University of Melbourne alumni politicians